Ansley is an unincorporated community in Hancock County, Mississippi, United States.

History

Ansley was established as a flag stop on the Louisville and Nashville Railroad (L&NRR), which was constructed between New Orleans, Louisiana and Mobile, Alabama during 1869 and 1870. The community derived its name from M.M. Ansley, who was a railroad maintenance official for the L&NRR.

During the early years after its establishment, Ansley was a postal village.

Hurricane damage

Because of its proximity to the Gulf of Mexico and  elevation, Ansley was reported to be destroyed by the tidal surge from Hurricane Katrina in 2005.

Ansley Preserve

References

Unincorporated communities in Hancock County, Mississippi
Unincorporated communities in Mississippi